Péter Szondi (27 May 1929, Budapest – 18 October 1971, Berlin) was a celebrated literary scholar and philologist, originally from Hungary.

Biography
Szondi's father was the Hungarian-Jewish psychiatrist and psychoanalyst Léopold Szondi, who settled in Switzerland after his 1944 release after five months in Bergen-Belsen.

In 1965, Péter became a Professor at the Free University of Berlin, where he led the Institute for General and Comparative Literature. His fields were the history of literature and comparative literature. 

He committed suicide in 1971 by drowning himself in the Halensee in Berlin on 18 October, leaving unfinished his book about the work of his friend Paul Celan, who had killed himself the year before.

Works 
 Über eine "Freie Universität". Suhrkamp, 1973
 Die Theorie des bürgerlichen Trauerspiels im 18. Jahrhundert. Suhrkamp, 1973
 Celan-Studien. Suhrkamp, 1972 = Celan Studies, trans. Susan Bernofsky with Harvey Mendelsohn, Stanford University Press, 2003. 
 Hölderlin-Studien. Insel, 1967
 Satz und Gegensatz. Insel, 1964
 Der andere Pfeil. Insel, 1963
 Versuch über das Tragische. Insel, 1961
 Theorie des modernen Dramas. Suhrkamp, 1956
 "Hope in the Past: On Walter Benjamin", reprinted in Benjamin, W. (trans. Howard Eiland), Berlin Childhood Around 1900, 2006, Belknap Press [Harvard UP].

References

External links 
 Peter Szondi and Critical Hermeneutics, an issue of Telos (140, Fall 2007)

1929 births
1971 deaths
Bergen-Belsen concentration camp survivors
Comparative literature academics
Academic staff of the Free University of Berlin
Hungarian Jews
Writers from Budapest
Suicides by drowning in Germany
Hungarian emigrants to Germany
1971 suicides